Sarah Louise Newton,  (née Hick, 19 July 1961) is a British retired politician who served as the Member of Parliament (MP) for Truro and Falmouth from 2010 to 2019. A member of the Conservative Party, she served as Minister of State for Disabled People, Work and Health from 2017 to 2019.

Early life
Born in Gloucestershire, Newton moved to Cornwall at an early age, and attended Marlborough Infants, Clare Terrace Primary School and Falmouth School, where she was elected Head Girl.

Newton read History at King's College London.  She completed a master's degree in the United States, studying as a Rotary International Scholar.

Professional career
Newton began her career as a marketing officer for businesses including Citibank and American Express. During her six years working for American Express, Newton was responsible for strategic planning, marketing and promotion of the card in the United Kingdom. In the early 1990s, Newton served as the director of Age Concern England. After leaving this post, Newton served as a founder and the initial director of The International Longevity Centre.

Political career
Newton was previously a councillor on Merton Council, and served as both chairman and Vice-Chairman of Wimbledon Conservatives. During her time in Wimbledon, Newton served as the head of Friends of Cannizaro Park.

Newton was first elected to the House of Commons in the 2010 general election. She beat the Liberal Democrat candidate by 435 votes. In 2015 she won re-election with 44% of the overall vote. After both elections, Newton was one of four MPs sworn into office after taking their oaths in Cornish.

During the 2016 EU membership referendum, Newton was one of several figures from the South West region who signed a statement backing the Britain Stronger in Europe campaign.

She became Parliamentary Under Secretary of State for Crime, Safeguarding and Vulnerability in July 2016. In November 2017, she became the Minister of State for Disabled People, Work and Health. In March 2019, she resigned from this role to vote against the government whip on a motion to prevent the United Kingdom from ever leaving the EU without a deal.

On 28 October 2019 she announced that she would not stand at the next election.

Newton stood down at the December 2019 general election.

Later career 
Newton was appointed Chair of the Health and Safety Executive from 1 August 2020.

Notes

References

External links
 Official website
Government biography

1961 births
Living people
Alumni of King's College London
People from Gloucestershire
People from Cornwall
Conservative Party (UK) MPs for English constituencies
UK MPs 2010–2015
UK MPs 2015–2017
UK MPs 2017–2019
Members of the Parliament of the United Kingdom for constituencies in Cornwall
Female members of the Parliament of the United Kingdom for English constituencies
Councillors in the London Borough of Merton
21st-century British women politicians
Politicians from Cornwall
21st-century English women
21st-century English people
Women councillors in England